The Mosel wine region, located almost entirely in the state of Rhineland-Palatinate, with a small part in Saarland, is one of the 13 regions (Anbaugebiete) for quality wine in Germany defined in the federal wine legislation. For each of the quality wine regions, the state where the vineyards are located keeps a formal vineyard roll (Weinbergsrolle) which lists all formally recognised vineyards of the region, with detailed surveying maps defining the geographical extent of each vineyard. Thus, the full list of Mosel vineyards in fact consist of separate lists in two German states. These lists defines which geographical designations may appear on the wine labels under the principles set down by the national wine law. The lists includes single vineyard designations (Einzellagen), which are grouped together into collective vineyards (Großlagen). Both single and collective vineyard designations are used together with village names.

The state of Rhineland-Palatinate lists the following vineyards. The vineyards are listed by district (Bereich) broadly from west to east, in the downstream direction of the river Moselle.

District Moseltor 

The following vineyards are defined for Moseltor.

District Obermosel

District Saar

District Ruwertal 

The following single vineyard sites are defined for Ruwertal. There is no collective vineyard site (Großlage) in Ruwertal.

District Bernkastel

District Burg Cochem

References 

Mosel vineyards
Vineyards of Germany
Mosel
Vineyards